His Majesty's Yacht Britannia was a gaff-rigged cutter built in 1893 for RYS Commodore Albert Edward, Prince of Wales. She served both himself and his son King George V with a long racing career.

Design
Britannia was ordered in 1892 by the Prince of Wales and designed by George Lennox Watson. She was a near sister ship to the Watson-designed  which challenged for the 1893 America's Cup. Details of the commission were arranged on the Prince’s behalf by William Jamieson who represented him and liaised closely with Watson. The build cost was £8,300 and like Valkyrie II, Britannia was built at the D&W Henderson shipyard in Partick on the River Clyde. With two such highly important commissions underway in the same yard, Watson delegated his protégé James Rennie Barnett to oversee both yachts.

Racing career
Britannia was launched on 20 April 1893, a week ahead of Valkyrie II and joined a fleet of first class cutters that was growing fast as others followed the royal lead. In a highly competitive fleet, Britannia soon set about achieving the race results which would eventually establish her as the most successful racing yacht of all time.

By the end of her first year's racing, Britannia had scored thirty-three wins from forty-three starts. In her second season, she won all seven races for the first class yachts on the French Riviera, and then beat the 1893 America's Cup defender  in home waters. In the Mount's Bay Regatta of 28 July 1894 the Vigilant owned by Jay Gould, director of the American Cable Company, was piloted by Benjamin Nicholls of Penzance, and the Prince of Wales's yacht Britannia was piloted by Ben's brother Philip Nicholls. Britannia won by just over seven minutes. People came by train from all over the south west to watch this race. Both brothers were Trinity House pilots of Penzance.

Despite a lull in big yacht racing after 1897, Britannia served as a trial horse for Sir Thomas Lipton's first America's Cup challenger , and later passed on to several owners in a cruising trim with raised bulwarks. In 1920, King George V triggered the revival of the "Big class" by announcing that he would refit Britannia for racing. Although Britannia was the oldest yacht in the circuit, regular updates to her rig kept her a most successful racer throughout the 1920s. Her last race was at Cowes in 1935. During her racing career she had won 231 races and took another 129 flags.

King George V's dying wish was for his beloved yacht to follow him to the grave.

Five known examples of Britannias racing flags are preserved, one presented by Philip Hunloke to the Royal Cornwall Yacht Club, in whose regattas Britannia was often a competitor between 1894 and 1935, the second at the Royal Northern and Clyde Yacht Club at Rhu and the third at the Royal St. George Yacht Club, which held two regattas in Kingstown for the first season of the RYA linear rating rule in 1896. Britannias skipper William G. Jameson had lost both races to the new Meteor II and Ailsa. The fourth known flag is held in the vexillology collection in the National Maritime Museum at Greenwich. The fifth example is now on display at the K1 Britannia base in Cowes on The Isle of Wight, on loan from the family of a former member of the crew who served as Yeoman Signaller on Britannia during the 1931 - 1933 racing seasons inclusive.

The spinnaker boom was given for use as a flag pole on the keep (where it twice suffered lightning damage), and the present flagpole is a fibreglass replica. In an episode of Antiques Roadshow from Pembroke Castle, broadcast in April 2017, a relative of a crew member brought photographs, and a damask tablecloth and some cutlery from the yacht, to be appraised.

Replica
K1 Britannia is a project to create a replica of the original vessel where K1 designates the Britannias sail number when she was converted to the J class in 1931. In 1993, a syndicate headed by Norwegian Sigurd Coates purchased a stake in the Solombala shipyard in Arkhangelsk in order to create a replica of the Britannia in pinewood and laminated oak. Between 2002 and 2006, the shipyard changed hands several times whilst joinery was nearing completion. In 2006, she was rechristened Царь Пётр (Tsar Pyotr; "Peter the Great") and held back for NOK25,000,000 until 2009, when a Russian court ordered the hull to be launched and delivered by the shipyard to her original owner Sigurd Coates. The story behind this 16-year saga was captured on film by director and producer Ann Coates and released in a documentary called The Dream of Britannia.

Having finally taken possession of the Britannia replica, Sigurd Coates berthed the hull in Son for outfitting. As this period coincided with the economic recession, work was stalled and Coates decided to sell the boat to the K1 Britannia Trust in the UK. This charity was established with the goal of completing Britannia and using her as a flagship for charitable causes around the world.

The replica Britannia was towed to the South Boats yard in East Cowes in 2012. The Trust invested in the scaffolding, cradle, tools and workmen required and work began on the final stages of the Britannia build. This came to a halt in 2014 when the Southboats yard was declared bankrupt.

In September 2018 the K1 Britannia Trust announced that it is to build an entirely new replica. This decision followed surveys of the existing replica and a full scope of the work still to be undertaken. The conclusion was reached that in the interests of sustainability, the new replica would have an all-aluminium hull and keel, a keel-stepped carbon mast, box boom and bowsprit, carbon continuous rigging, and a hybrid propulsion package.

Predecessors and opponents
Previously Prince Albert Edward had acquired the 205-ton schooner Hildegarde in 1876, which he had replaced with the 103-ton cutter Formosa (Michael E. Ratsey, 1878) in 1879, and the 216-ton schooner Aline (Benjamin Nicholson, 1860) in 1881.

Britannia faced many opponents in her 43-year career. The most notable were:
Meteor, Valkyrie II and Valkyrie III (America's Cup challengers by George Lennox Watson, 1887, 1893 and 1895)
Navahoe and Vigilant (Seawanhaka 85' yankee sloops by Nathanael Greene Herreshoff, 1893)
Satanita ("Length And Sail Area Rule" First Class cutter by Joseph Manston Soper, 1893)
Calluna and Ailsa ("Length And Sail Area Rule" First Class cutters by William Fife III, 1893 and 1894)
Meteor II ("Linear Rule" First Class cutter by George Lennox Watson, 1896)
Shamrock I (America's Cup Seawanhaka 90' challenger by William Fife III, 1899)
Merrymaid ("Big Class" handicap cruising cutter, Charles Ernest Nicholson, 1904, still sailing)
Zinita ("Big Class" Second Linear Rule 65' cutter by William Fife III, 1904)
Nyria ("Big Class" bermuda cutter by Charles Ernest Nicholson, 1905)
Brynhild II ("International Rule" 23mR cutter by Charles Ernest Nicholson, 1907)
White Heather II and Shamrock ("International Rule" 23mR cutters by William Fife III, 1907 and 1908)
Westward (A-Class schooner by Nathanael Greene Herreshoff, 1910)
Lulworth ("Big Class" cutter by Herbert William White, 1920, still sailing)
Moonbeam IV ("Big Class" handicap cruising cutter by William Fife III, 1920, still sailing)
Astra and Candida ("Second International Rule" 23mR bermuda cutters by Charles Ernest Nicholson, 1928 and 1929, both still sailing)
Cambria ("Second International Rule" 23mR bermuda cutter by William Fife III, 1928, still sailing)
Shamrock V, Velsheda and Endeavour I ("Universal Rule" J-Class cutters by Charles Ernest Nicholson, 1930, 1933 and 1934, all still sailing)
Yankee ("Universal Rule" J-Class sloop by Frank Cabot Paine, 1930)

Racing record

Bibliography

 - 24 videos

External links

G.L. Watson & Co. Ltd.

1893 in sports
Ships built on the River Clyde
J-class yachts
Royal Yachts of the United Kingdom
Individual sailing vessels
1893 ships
1893 in Scotland